Whitefish Point is a cape of Michigan's Upper Peninsula, United States, marking the entry point of Whitefish Bay.

Whitefish Point is known for the Great Lakes Shipwreck Museum, its Lake Superior shoreline, the Whitefish Point Lighthouse and as a prime birding area.  Whitefish Point is a designated Important Bird Area. The Whitefish Point Bird Observatory, an affiliate of the Michigan Audubon Society, operates a research and education facility at Whitefish Point.

At 17 miles away, Whitefish Point is the nearest navigation mark to the wreckage of the ore freighter SS Edmund Fitzgerald, which sank in 1975. Whitefish Point remains one of the most dangerous shipping areas in the Great Lakes, Known as the graveyard of the Great Lakes, more vessels have been lost in the Whitefish Point area than any other part of Lake Superior.

The Whitefish Point Underwater Preserve protects the shipwrecks in a portion of the bay for future generations of sports divers.

The Point is a popular place for rock collectors, ship watchers, and bird watching.  Whitefish Point's land and water provides a natural corridor for birds that makes it a migratory route of world significance.  It is a designated Important Bird Area where the Whitefish Point Bird Observatory conducts important research.

Whitefish Point is the home of a former United States Coast Guard station.

References

External links

Geography of Chippewa County, Michigan
Headlands of the United States